Flight 62 may refer to:

Iberia Flight 062
Sriwijaya Air Flight 062

0062